Albergaria may refer to:

People
João Soares de Albergaria, 1st Donatary-Captain of Santa Maria
Lopo Soares de Albergaria, third Governor of Portuguese India

Places
Albergaria-a-Velha, municipality in the district of Aveiro, Portugal
Albergaria (Palermo), a quarter of Palermo, Sicily

Portuguese-language surnames